Volcán Jumaytepeque is a stratovolcano in south-eastern Guatemala.  The  volcano is located about 7 km north-north-east of the city of Cuilapa, near the south-eastern rim of the large Miocene Santa Rosa de Lima caldera.

See also
 List of volcanoes in Guatemala

References 

Mountains of Guatemala
Stratovolcanoes of Guatemala